Kitakawachi Dam is a dam in the Ishikawa Prefecture of Japan, completed in 2010.

References 

Dams in Ishikawa Prefecture
Dams completed in 2010